Massanutten Mountain is a synclinal ridge in the Ridge-and-Valley Appalachians, located in the U.S. state of Virginia. It is near the West Virginia state line.

Geography
The mountain bisects the Shenandoah Valley just east of Strasburg in Shenandoah County in the north, to its highest peak east of Harrisonburg in Rockingham County in the south.

The mountain is divided into northern and southern sections, divided by the New Market Gap.  The northern section consists of 3 roughly parallel ridges, forming 2 valleys.  The wider, main valley, is called Fort Valley, while the smaller one is known as Little Fort Valley.  The ridges of the northern section converge at New Market Gap. The southern section consists of a series of closely gathered ridges, separated by precipitous creek gorges.

On the eastern side of the mountain range lie the Page Valley and the Blue Ridge Mountains. On the western side lie the North-Central Shenandoah Valley and the Great North Mountain of the Alleghany Mountains.

Recreation
Most of the range is part of the Lee Ranger District of the George Washington National Forest and contains the Elizabeth Furnace and Camp Roosevelt recreational areas.  The Potomac Appalachian Trail Club maintains the Massanutten Trail as well as several other hiking trails in the forest. Signal Knob, a former Civil War signal station on the northern peak of the mountain, is a popular destination.  The forest service also maintains several ATV trails.

In 1971, the Massanutten Mountain ski lodge and four-season resort village was established near the southern peak. The private resort has nearly doubled in size since Great Eastern Resorts bought it in 1995.

Flora and fauna
Wildlife on Massanutten includes black bear, coyotes, wild turkeys, white-tailed deer, timber rattlesnake, and luna moths. Significant flora includes mayapple, bluets, wild lupine, cardinal flower, and pinxter flower.

Geology
The geology of the Massanutten Mountains is dominated by Silurian Massanutten Sandstone, a lateral equivalent of the Tuscarora Formation in the Appalachian Mountains to the west, overlying the Ordovician Martinsburg Formation. Erosion of the Martinsburg shale in some areas of the mountain caused the sandstone to break and slide to form talus slopes. The Massanutten Sandstone is folded in a synclinorium, and it outcrops at the ridge tops.

Mountains of Massanutten
 Massanutten Peak
 Green Mountain
 Three Top Mountain
 Powell Mountain
 Little Crease Mountain
 Short Mountain
 Mertins Rock
 Bowman Mountain
 Kerns Mountain
 Catback Mountain
 Waterfall Mountain
 First Mountain
 Second Mountain
 Third Mountain
 Fourth Mountain

Notes

Mountains of Page County, Virginia
Mountains of Rockingham County, Virginia
Mountains of Shenandoah County, Virginia
Mountains of Warren County, Virginia
Ridges of Virginia
Shenandoah River